Christel Pascal (born 6 October 1973) is a former French alpine skier who competed in the 2002 Winter Olympics.

External links
 sports-reference.com
 

1973 births
Living people
French female alpine skiers
Olympic alpine skiers of France
Alpine skiers at the 2002 Winter Olympics
Place of birth missing (living people)